Barbara Nelle Ramusack (born November 5, 1937) is a historian and Charles Phelps Taft Professor of History Emerita at the University of Cincinnati. Her focus was on Indian and Chinese History. She obtained her Ph.D in 1969 from the University of Michigan.

Selected bibliography

Books

Chapters in books

Journal articles 
 
 
 Ramusack, Barbara N. (1969). "Incident at Nabha: Interaction between the Indian States and British Indian Politics, The Journal of Asian Studies, Vol. 28, No. 3, pp. 563–577.

References 

University of Cincinnati faculty
Historians of India
Living people
University of Michigan alumni
21st-century American historians
1937 births
American women historians
Women's historians
21st-century American women writers